Byard may refer to:

People
 D. J. Byard (1859–1949), proprietor and headmaster of Hahndorf College, South Australia
 Jaki Byard (1922–1999), American jazz pianist, composer, and trumpet and saxophone player
 Kevin Byard (born 1993), American National Football League player
 Paul Byard (1939–2008), American lawyer and architect
 Thomas Byard (died 1800), British Royal Navy officer during the French Revolutionary Wars
 Byard Lancaster (1942–2012), American jazz saxophonist and flutist

Other uses
 , a Royal Navy frigate during World War II
 Byard Lane, Nottingham, England

See also
Bayard (disambiguation)
Biard (disambiguation)
Briard
Byrd (disambiguation)